Shikhali Gurban oglu Gurbanov (1925, Baku—May 24, 1967, Baku) was an Azerbaijani writer, philologist and statesman.

Assassination

On May 24, 1967, he was murdered by a lethal injection of cyanic acid, while visiting a dentist. The dentist escaped and was never found.

The murder reportedly happened shortly before the extraordinary plenum of Azerbaijan Communist Party, where Gurbanov was expected to be elected the First Secretary of the Party.

1925 births
1967 deaths
Communist writers
Azerbaijani philologists
Azerbaijani literary theorists
Deaths by poisoning
People murdered in Azerbaijan
Azerbaijani murder victims
Azerbaijan Communist Party (1920) politicians
20th-century philologists